Acarus is a genus of mites in the family Acaridae.

Species
 Acarus ananas (Tryon, 1898)
 Acarus beschkovi (Mitov, 1994)
 Acarus bomiensis Wang, 1982
 Acarus calcarabellus (Griffiths, 1965)
 Acarus chaetoxysilos Griffiths, 1970
 Acarus ebrius Ashfaq, Akhtar & Chaudhri, 1986
 Acarus farinae DeGeer, 1778
 Acarus farris (Oudemans, 1905)
 Acarus fengxianensis Wang, 1985
 Acarus gracilis Hughes, 1957
 Acarus griffithsi Ranganath & Channa Basavanna, in Ranganath, Channa Basavanna & Krishna-Rao 1981
 Acarus immobilis Griffiths, 1964
 Acarus inaequalis (Banks, 1916)
 Acarus lushanensis Jiang, 1992
 Acarus monopsyllus Fain & Schwan, 1984
 Acarus nidicolus Griffiths, 1970
 Acarus queenslandiae (Canestrini, 1884)
 Acarus rhombeus Koch & Berendt, 1854
 Acarus sentus Ashfaq, Akhtar & Chaudhri, 1986
 Acarus siro Linnaeus, 1758
 Acarus umbonis Ashfaq, Akhtar & Chaudhri, 1986

References

Acaridae